Hallam Tennyson, 2nd Baron Tennyson,  (11 August 1852 – 2 December 1928) was a British aristocrat who served as the second governor-general of Australia, in office from 1903 to 1904. He was previously Governor of South Australia from 1899 to 1902.

Tennyson was born in Twickenham, Middlesex, and educated at Marlborough College and Trinity College, Cambridge. He was the eldest son of the poet Alfred, Lord Tennyson, and served as his personal secretary and biographer; he succeeded to his father's title in 1892. Tennyson was made Governor of South Australia in 1899. When Lord Hopetoun resigned the governor-generalship in mid-1902, Tennyson was the longest-serving state governor and thus became Administrator of the Government. Tennyson was eventually chosen to be Hopetoun's permanent replacement, but accepted only a one-year term. He was more popular than his predecessor among the general public, but had a tense relationship with Prime Minister Alfred Deakin and was not offered an extension to his term. Tennyson retired to the Isle of Wight, and spent the rest of his life upholding his father's legacy.

Early life

Hallam Tennyson was born in Chapel House, a house his father was renting in Twickenham, Middlesex. His parents were Emily (née Sellwood) and Alfred Tennyson. He was named after his father's deceased friend Arthur Hallam. Tennyson's early childhood was spent at Farringford House on the Isle of Wight, which his father began renting in 1853 and bought in 1856. He was educated at Marlborough College and Trinity College,  Cambridge. Tennyson's career aspirations ended when his parents' age and ill-health obliged him to leave Cambridge to become their personal secretary. The idea of going into politics was also abandoned.

It was partly for Hallam's benefit that Alfred Tennyson accepted a peerage in 1884, the year Hallam married Audrey Boyle (after being disappointed in his love for Mary Gladstone, daughter of William Ewart Gladstone). On his father's death in 1892, he inherited the title Baron Tennyson, and also the role of official biographer. His Tennyson: a Memoir was published in 1897.

His second wife was May Prinsep, widow of Andrew Hichens (d. 1906), a leading broker on the stock exchange.  Mary Emily "May" (1853-1931) was the daughter of Charles Robert Prinsep, advocate-general of Calcutta; and niece of Henry Thoby Prinsep, who adopted her when she was eleven upon her father's death.  May also was the niece of early photographer Julia Margaret Cameron.

Governor of South Australia
Like his father, Tennyson was an ardent imperialist, and in 1883 he had become a council member of the Imperial Federation League, a lobby group set up to support the imperialist ideas of the Colonial Secretary, Joseph Chamberlain. It was this connection, as well as the Tennyson name, that led Chamberlain to offer Tennyson the position of Governor of South Australia in 1899. He was still in this position in May 1902, when the Governor-General of Australia, the Earl of Hopetoun, suddenly announced his intention to resign.

Governor-General of Australia

Tennyson was the senior state governor at the time of Hopetoun's announcement, and thus became Administrator of the Government upon his departure from Australia on 17 July 1902. There were some doubts about his ability to fill the job on a permanent basis since he had little experience of politics. But he had made a good impression in Australia through his modesty and frugality, unlike the ostentatiously imperious Hopetoun. In December 1902 he accepted the post for, at his own suggestion, a one-year appointment only.

The new Governor-General was popular and got on with Australians far better than his predecessor had done. But problems arose through the ambiguity of his position. The Prime Minister, Alfred Deakin, insisted that the Governor-General's official secretary must be appointed and paid by the Australian government. The British government objected (privately) because this would mean that the Governor-General could not carry out what was seen in London as his broader role in supervising the Australian government. Tennyson shared this view.

As a result, relations between Deakin and Tennyson grew tense. Deakin correctly suspected that Tennyson was reporting on him to London and trying to interfere on matters of policy, such as the naval agreement between Britain and Australia. For this reason Deakin did not encourage Tennyson to seek an extension of his one-year term. None of this was known to the public and Tennyson left Australia in January 1904 to universal expressions of approval.

Retirement and death

Tennyson spent the rest of his life at Farringford, serving as deputy Governor of the Isle of Wight from 1913. His wife died in 1916, and in 1918 he remarried to Mary Emily (May) Prinsep (1853–1931). She was the daughter of Charles Robert Prinsep, born in India and later the owner of a large nutmeg plantation in Singapore. Tennyson was May Prinsep's second husband; her first husband was Andrew Hichens. The National Portrait Gallery has eight photographs of May Prinsep, taken by her relation Julia Margaret Cameron on the Isle of Wight.

Tennyson bequeathed many of his father's notebooks to Trinity College in 1924. 

Tennyson died at Farringford on 2 December 1928.

Commemoration
 A large oil portrait of Tennyson hangs in Admiralty House, Kirribilli.
 Tennyson's coat of arms is painted in the entry foyer of Government House, Sydney.

Arms

References

External links
 
 

1852 births
1928 deaths
Governors-General of Australia
Governors of South Australia
Governors of the Colony of South Australia
Barons Tennyson
People from Twickenham
People educated at Marlborough College
Alumni of Trinity College, Cambridge
Knights Grand Cross of the Order of St Michael and St George
Members of the Privy Council of the United Kingdom
Translators from Old English
Hallam
Eldest sons of British hereditary barons
British colonial governors and administrators in Oceania